Ferland may refer to:

People

 Danielle Ferland (1971-), American actress
 Guy Ferland (1966-), American film and television director
 Jean-Baptiste-Antoine Ferland (1805-1865), Canadian historian
 Jean-Pierre Ferland (1932-), Canadian singer and songwriter
 Jodelle Ferland (1994-), Canadian actress
 Jonathan Ferland (1983-), Canadian ice hockey player
 Logan Ferland (1997–), Canadian football player
 Luc Ferland, Canadian politician
 Marc Ferland (politician) (1942-), Canadian politician
 Martin Ferland (1970-), Canadian curler
 Timothy Sean Ferland (1967-), American Chamber of Commerce President
Micheal Ferland, professional ice hockey player

Places

 Ferland, Saskatchewan
 Ferland Airport, local airport in Ferland, Saskatchewan